Eighteen History Books of Jin are those history books which were published and used as the history books of the Jin dynasty before the Book of Jin was published.

They comprised Book of Jin from nine kinds and Annals of Jin from nine kinds. Many history books of the Jin dynasty began to disappear from the scene after the Book of Jin was written in the period Zhenguan (貞觀: 627–649) of the Tang dynasty and they were going to be hard to find at the days of Song dynasty (960–1279).

Some of their contents are extant in the form of the annotations of  Liu Yiqing (劉義慶, 403–444)'s A New Account of the Tales of the World (世說新語), Pei Songzhi's annotations at Records of Three Kingdoms (c. 429), Xiao Tong (蕭統) 's book Wen Xuan (文選: c. 520) and Li Fang's book Imperial Readings of the Taiping Era (太平御覽: c. 980). Especially Zang Rongxu (臧榮緒: 415–488)'s Book of Jin and Wang Yin (王隱)'s Book of Jin survived comparatively much to this day.

As most of them were written during the Jin dynasty itself, it seems that they were incomplete and some of them were only of the Western Jin, though the Book of Jin of Zang Rongxu is thought to be more complete, since it comprised from Sima Yi, the founder of Jin to the Jin's fall by the Liu Yu (劉裕: 363–422) and it consisted of 110 books.

Therefore, Book of Jin of Fang Xuanling (房玄齡: 579–648) is thought to have consulted to Zang Rongxu's book.

Book of Jin (晉書) of nine kinds

虞預 『晉書』 （晉）
朱鳳 『晉書』 （晉）
王隱 『晉書』 （晉）
謝靈運 『晉書』 （宋）
何法盛 『晉中興書』 （宋）
臧榮緒 『晉書』 （斉）
蕭子雲 『晉書』 （梁）
蕭子顯 『晉書草』 （梁）
沈約 『晉書』 （梁）

Annals of Jin (晉紀) of nine kinds

陸機 『晉紀』 （晉）
干寶 『晉紀』 （晉）
曹嘉之 『晉紀』 （晉）
鄧粲 『晉紀』 （晉）
徐廣 『晉紀』 （晉）
劉謙之 『晉紀』 （宋）
王韶之 『晉安帝紀』 （宋）
郭季產 『晉錄』 （宋）
裴松之 『晉紀』 （宋）

Chinese history texts
History books about the Jin dynasty (266–420)